Arthur Purdy (23 July 1904 – 1979) was an English footballer who played in the Football League for Blackpool, Durham City, Luton Town, Norwich City and Southend United.

References

1904 births
1970 deaths
English footballers
Association football goalkeepers
English Football League players
Tottenham Hotspur F.C. players
Luton Town F.C. players
Southend United F.C. players
Durham City A.F.C. players
Blackpool F.C. players
Colwyn Bay F.C. players
Norwich City F.C. players
Fleetwood Town F.C. players